Sir Charles Barrington, 5th Baronet (ca. 1671 – 29 January 1715) was an English Tory politician.

Background and education
He was the second son of Thomas Barrington and his wife Lady Anne Rich, daughter of Robert Rich, 3rd Earl of Warwick. His father was the first son of Sir John Barrington, 3rd Baronet but had died before Sir John. Barrington was educated at Felsted School. He succeeded his older brother John, who had died from smallpox aged only 21, as baronet in 1691.

Career
Barrington entered the English House of Commons in 1694, sitting for Essex until 1705. He represented the constituency again in the Parliament of Great Britain from 1713 until his death two years later. In 1702, Barrington was appointed Vice-Admiral of Essex, a post he held until 1705 and later again from 1712 for another two years. He was a freeman of Maldon, Essex and served as the town's alderman and bailiff.

Family and death
On 20 April 1693, he married firstly Bridget Monson, daughter of Sir John Monson, 2nd Baronet, at St Bride's Church in London. She died in 1699 and Barrington remarried Hon. Anna Marie FitzWilliam, daughter of William FitzWilliam, 1st Earl FitzWilliam on 23 May 1700. He died childless and was succeeded in the baronetcy by his cousin John Shales, who changed his surname to Barrington as a condition of the inheritance. Barrington was buried at Hatfield Broad Oak in Essex.

References

1670s births
1715 deaths
Baronets in the Baronetage of England
British MPs 1713–1715
Members of the Parliament of Great Britain for English constituencies
People educated at Felsted School
English MPs 1695–1698
English MPs 1698–1700
English MPs 1701
English MPs 1701–1702
English MPs 1702–1705